Cheritra  orpheus is a butterfly in the family Lycaenidae. It was described by Cajetan Felder and Rudolf  Felder in 1862. It is  found  in the Philippines in the Indomalayan realm.

Subspecies
C. o. orpheus  (Philippines: Luzon, Mindoro, Ticao)
C. o. eurydice Fruhstorfer, 1912 (Palawan)
C. o. orphnine Cowan, 1967 (Philippines: Mindanao)

References

External links
  Cheritra at Markku Savela's Lepidoptera and Some Other Life Forms

Cheritra
Butterflies described in 1862